Ijah Halley (born 14 August 2001) is a Canadian professional soccer player who plays as an winger for Simcoe County Rovers FC.

Early life
Halley played youth soccer with the Woodbridge Strikers and Erin Mills SC. Halley joined the Toronto FC Academy in 2017 and featured with the second team Toronto FC II during some pre-season and exhibition matches.

Club career
On 27 April 2020, Halley signed his first professional contract with Canadian Premier League side York9 (which became York United the following year) on a multi-year deal. He made his debut on August 15 against Atlético Ottawa, coming on as a substitute. After the 2021 season, Halley's contract expired with the club and although the club remained in negotiations for a new contract, they did not come to an agreement. 

In 2022, he joined Scrosoppi FC in League1 Ontario.

In March 2023, he joined League1 Ontario side Simcoe County Rovers FC.

Career statistics

Notes

References

External links

2001 births
Living people
Association football midfielders
Canadian soccer players
Canadian people of Jamaican descent
Black Canadian soccer players
Soccer players from Brampton
League1 Ontario players
Canadian Premier League players
Woodbridge Strikers players
Toronto FC players
York United FC players
Scrosoppi FC players
Simcoe County Rovers FC players